Saint-Martory is a railway station in Saint-Martory, Occitanie, France. The station is on the Toulouse–Bayonne railway line. The station is served by TER (local) services operated by the SNCF.

Train services
The following services currently call at Saint-Martory:
local service (TER Occitanie) Toulouse–Saint-Gaudens–Tarbes–Pau

References

Railway stations in France opened in 1862
Railway stations in Haute-Garonne